Maurice Forbes (born September 9, 1987) is a former professional Canadian football defensive tackle for the Hamilton Tiger-Cats of the Canadian Football League. He was drafted 13th overall by the Tiger-Cats in the 2011 CFL Draft and signed with the team on June 1, 2011. He played CIS football for the Concordia Stingers.

References

1987 births
Living people
Canadian football defensive linemen
Concordia Stingers football players
Hamilton Tiger-Cats players
Players of Canadian football from Ontario
Canadian football people from Toronto